N'Djébonouan is a town in central Ivory Coast. It is a sub-prefecture and commune of Bouaké Department in Gbêkê Region, Vallée du Bandama District.

In 2014, the population of the sub-prefecture of N'Djébonouan was 30,821.

Villages
The 47 villages of the sub-prefecture of N'Djébonouan and their population in 2014 are

Notes

Sub-prefectures of Gbêkê
Communes of Gbêkê